The 2004 Women's FA Community Shield was the fifth Women's FA Community Shield, as with its male equivalent, the Community Shield is an annual football match played between the winners of the previous season's league and the previous season's Women's FA Cup. The match was contested between Charlton and Arsenal, Charlton won 1-0.

References

Women's FA Community Shield
Community Shield
Community Shield
Community Shield
Community Shield